Pinney is a surname. Notable people with the name include:
Charles Pinney (1793-1867), Bristol merchant and politician
Clay Pinney, American special effects artist
James A. Pinney (1835–1914), American mayor
John Pinney (1740–1818), Nevis plantation owner and Bristol sugar merchant
Nathaniel Pinney (born 1990), English soccer player
Patrick Pinney (born 1962), American voice actor
Rachel Pinney (1909–95), British doctor
Ray Pinney (born 1954), American Football player
Sir Reginald Pinney (1863–1943), British Army officer
Roy Pinney (1911–2010), American herpetologist, photographer, journalist and war correspondent
Russell Jan Pinney (born 1946), American insurance salesman
Sean P. Pinney, American cardiologist
Silas U. Pinney (1833–99), American jurist and politician

See also
Gavin Pretor-Pinney, British designer and author
Pinney's Beach, Nevis
14678 Pinney, Comet
Pinny Cooke (1923–2004), New York politician